The Old Vicarage is a restaurant located in Ridgeway, near Sheffield. The restaurant held one star in the Michelin Guide from 1998 to 2015. The head chef is TV chef Tessa Bramley.

References

External links

Restaurants in England
Michelin Guide starred restaurants in the United Kingdom
Tourist attractions in Derbyshire
Clergy houses in England
Houses in Derbyshire
Eckington, Derbyshire